The Battle of Gavere was fought at Semmerzake, near Gavere, in the County of Flanders (modern-day Belgium) on 23 July 1453, between the army of Philip the Good of Burgundy and the rebelling city of Ghent. The battle ended the Revolt of Ghent with a Burgundian victory.

Background
Ghent was the richest, most populous, and powerful city in the Burgundian Netherlands. The battle was a consequence of Ghent's opposition against a new salt tax. When the city openly declared its rebellion, the Duke assembled an army from neighbouring lands, including southern Flanders, and attacked three fortifications; Schendelbeke, Poeke, and Gavere.

Schendelbeke and Poeke were both taken with little effort and both garrisons were executed. The Burgundian army began its bombardment of Gavere on 18 July. The Ghentenaar relief army arrived on 23 July, not knowing the fort had fallen the day before. Philip, aware of the approach of the Ghentenaar army, drew up his army into battle lines. Finding Philip's army battle ready, the Ghentenaar army formed up.

Battle
The battle began with an artillery exchange, a first for the Burgundian army, and due to the superior range of the Ghentenaar artillery, Philip was forced to move his cannons closer to the enemy. Once in range, the Burgundian artillery began to weaken Ghentenaar morale, and numerous Ghentenaar soldiers fled. A Ghentenaar contemporary source claims a spark ignited an open sack of gunpowder causing an explosion which caused the Ghent cannoners to rout.

Seeing the enemy flee, the Burgundian army charged. Some Ghent soldiers regrouped to counter the charge, but their efforts were useless and casualties were high.

Afterwards
It was feared the Duke would destroy the city completely, but when asked to show mercy he is said to have replied "If I should destroy this city, who is going to build me one like it?"

The battle broke the power of Ghent only temporarily, as in 1539 there would be another revolt against the high taxes under Charles V, Holy Roman Emperor (see Revolt of Ghent (1539)).

Notes

References

Sources

 Charles Terlinden, Histoire militaire des Belges, Brussels, La Renaissance du Livre, 1931.

See also
 Loys of Gruuthuse
 Revolt of Ghent

External links
 History of the Battle of Gavere 

Gavere
History of Ghent
1453 in Europe
1450s in France
Gavere
1450s in the Burgundian Netherlands